Kimberly is a city in Jefferson County, Alabama, United States. At the 2020 census, the population was 3,841.

History
The city of Kimberly developed around a stagecoach station built in the 1830s; it remained in service until 1865. At this time, the settlement was known as Kennelsville. The city then became known as Jefferson, probably after the nearby Old Jefferson coal mine, until the late 1880s. In 1888, the town's post office was relocated to nearby Morris. In 1905, the town voted to change its name to Kimberly because another Alabama town had already claimed the name Jefferson. The town had a population of around 900 by 1910. Local coal mines were primary employers in Kimberly and were active through the 1940s, gradually closing down during the 1950s. Another significant employer in Kimberly was the Dixie Firebrick Company, founded in the 1930s; it was later bought out by A.P. Green Refractories Company. This facility shut down sometime in the mid-1970s. The city officially incorporated in 1952. Many city records and history were lost in a fire at the city hall in 1989. Beginning June 29, 2011, due to the population increasing from 1,801 persons in 2000 to 2,711 in 2010, the town began operating as a city, per Alabama law.

Geography
Kimberly is located at  (33.771163, -86.795280).

Demographics

2000 census
At the 2000 census there were 1,801 people, 652 households, and 528 families living in the town. The racial makeup of the town was 95.78% White, 1.61% Black or African American, 0.61% Native American, 0.17% Asian, 0.44% from other races, and 1.39% from two or more races. 1.17% of the population were Hispanic or Latino of any race.
Of the 652 households 42.2% had children under the age of 18 living with them, 68.3% were married couples living together, 9.5% had a female householder with no husband present, and 18.9% were non-families. 17.0% of households were one person and 8.4% were one person aged 65 or older. The average household size was 2.76 and the average family size was 3.11.

The age distribution was 29.3% under the age of 18, 6.7% from 18 to 24, 33.1% from 25 to 44, 20.5% from 45 to 64, and 10.5% 65 or older. The median age was 34 years. For every 100 females, there were 99.4 males. For every 100 females age 18 and over, there were 91.6 males.

The median household income was $46,343 and the median family income  was $52,109. Males had a median income of $36,977 versus $29,150 for females. The per capita income for the town was $17,055. About 6.7% of families and 7.7% of the population were below the poverty line, including 9.6% of those under age 18 and 15.8% of those age 65 or over.

2010 census
At the 2010 census there were 2,711 people, 932 households, and 752 families living in the city. The racial makeup of the city was 96.2% White, 1.8% Black or African American, 0.4% Native American, 0.6% Asian, 0.3% from other races, and .7% from two or more races. .8% of the population were Hispanic or Latino of any race.
Of the 932 households 41.7% had children under the age of 18 living with them, 67.0% were married couples living together, 10.2% had a female householder with no husband present, and 19.3% were non-families. 16.8% of households were one person and 6.8% were one person aged 65 or older. The average household size was 2.91 and the average family size was 3.28.

The age distribution was 28.7% under the age of 18, 8.0% from 18 to 24, 29.0% from 25 to 44, 25.4% from 45 to 64, and 9.0% 65 or older. The median age was 35.4 years. For every 100 females, there were 94.9 males. For every 100 females age 18 and over, there were 96.9 males.

2020 census

As of the 2020 United States census, there were 3,841 people, 1,168 households, and 947 families residing in the city.

Government
Elected Officials
 Mayor - Bob Ellerbrock
 Council Member/Mayor Pro Tem - Tanya Cowart
 Council Member - Kevin Powell 
 Council Member-James Harris
 Council Member - John Richardson  
 Council member - Jay Jenkins

Department Heads
City Clerk - Sandy Waid
Police Chief - Ricky Pridmore
Fire Chief - Brendt Wood
Streets and Parks Director - Lance Shivers

Education
 Bryan Elementary School
 North Jefferson Middle School
 Mortimer Jordan High School

All three schools are located in Kimberly, with North Jefferson Middle and Mortimer Jordan serving a feeder pattern consisting of Kimberly, Warrior, Morris, Trafford and several areas of extreme north Gardendale.

References

External links
 City of Kimberly

Cities in Jefferson County, Alabama
Cities in Alabama
Birmingham metropolitan area, Alabama